Pachythrissops is an extinct genus of ray-finned fish. It contains two species, P. laevis from the Purbeckian of England and P. propterus from the Tithonian of Germany. A third species, P. vectensis, has been reassigned to the elopiform genus Arratiaelops. Pachythrissops is often regarded as one of the most primitive members of the order Ichthyodectiformes; however, a phylogenetic analysis by Cavin et al. (2013) placed it and the related genus Ascalabothrissops outside the group.

Sources 

 Fossils (Smithsonian Handbooks) by David Ward (Page 215)

Ichthyodectiformes
Prehistoric ray-finned fish genera
Tithonian genera
Berriasian genera
Jurassic bony fish
Late Jurassic fish of Europe
Jurassic England
Cretaceous England
Fossils of England
Jurassic Germany
Fossils of Germany
Fossil taxa described in 1919
Taxa named by Arthur Smith Woodward